Ponga Pandit is 1975 Indian Hindi-language movie produced by Surinder Kapoor and directed by Prayag Raj. The film stars Randhir Kapoor, Neeta Mehta, Danny Denzongpa, Nirupa Roy, Madan Puri, Shreeram Lagoo and Ranjeet. The music is by Laxmikant Pyarelal.

Plot
Haridwar-based Neelkanth Pandey and Shambhu Nath get their children, Bhagwantiprasad and Parvati respectively, married. While Shambhu re-locates to live in Bombay, Neelkanth continues to reside in the same residence. Years later, both children have grown up, so Neelkanth invites the Naths to finalize the nuptials. Very soon the Pandeys will face humiliation and ridicule at the hands of Parvati, who now calls herself Pamela, and Shambhu, who wants his daughter to marry someone sophisticated and wealthy, while Parvati is in love with a singer named Rocky. Bhagwanti is determined to fulfill his parents' wishes and decides to stay wed to Parvati, re-locates to Bombay, to try and woo her back - with results that will end up changing his life forever

Cast
 Randhir Kapoor as Bhagwati Prasad Neelkanth Pandey / Prem
 Neeta Mehta as Parvati 'Pamela' S. Nath
 Danny Denzongpa as Rocky
 Prema Narayan as Lalita
 Nirupa Roy as Janki S. Nath
 Madan Puri as Shambhu Nath
 Shreeram Lagoo as Professor
 Ranjeet as Master
 Pinchoo Kapoor as Neelkanth Prasad Pandey

Soundtrack

External links 
 
 
 

1975 films
1970s Hindi-language films
Films scored by Laxmikant–Pyarelal